Jinjoon Lee FRSA (이진준 born in Masan, South Korea) is a professor, sculptor, new media artist and creative director exploring the liminoid experience of utopian space ideologies with new technologies.

Education
After graduating from the Business School of Seoul National University in 2001, he obtained a BFA(2005) and an MFA(2009) in Sculpture from SNU. He then went on to pursue a master's degree(2017) in Moving Image(Jane and Louise Wilson) and Design Interaction (Anthony Dunne) at the Royal College of Art in London, and a Doctor of Philosophy from the Ruskin School of Fine Art, University of Oxford. His doctoral thesis was titled Empty Garden: A Liminoid Journey to Nowhere in Somewhere (2020), which manifested as a 10-meter-long scroll that mixes East Asian garden aesthetics with existentialism, poetry and autoethnographic research addressing a new theoretical perspective on virtual and augmented reality.

Career
Since giving his debut solo exhibition at ARKO Art Centre of Arts Council Korea in 2008, Lee has exhibited at numerous venues worldwide including Seoul Metropolitan Museum, Korea National Museum of Modern and Contemporary Art, India International Centre, The Prague National Gallery in the Czech Republic, The National Museum of Bulgaria, Royal College of Art and Royal College of Music in London. He is a Fellow of the Royal Society of Arts (FRSA) and a full-fledged member of the Royal Society of Sculptors (MRSS). Lee's studio is perhaps best known for the public media sculpture They, which was permanently installed at Digital Media City, Seoul in 2010, and works on the architectural design and development of innovative projects for various requests around the world. Having previously taught at the University of Oxford, he was appointed a professor at KAIST (Korea Advanced Institute of Science and Technology) and researches on Data-driven Art and Design, Digital Architecture and XR Performance for Future Opera with new technologies like VR, AI, and NFTs at his TX Creative Media Lab. Currently he is the founding director of the KAIST Art Museum.

Public collections 
 National Museum of Contemporary Art, Gacheon, Korea
 The Farjam Collection In DIFC (Dubai International Financial Center), Dubai
 Seoul National University, College of Engineering, Seoul, Korea
 Hyundai Group. Seoul, Korea
 Marriott Hotel, Seoul, Korea
 Ministry for National Defense, Seoul, Korea
 Yonsei University, Seoul, Korea
 Pakyoung Inc., Paju, Korea
 Sang-Am Digital Media City (DMC), Seoul Metropolitan Government, Seoul, Korea
 Space*C Coreana Museum of Contemporary Art, Seoul, Korea

References

External links 
 Official website

1974 births
Living people
South Korean video artists
South Korean contemporary artists
South Korean sculptors
Creative directors
Installation artists
Alumni of St Hugh's College, Oxford
Alumni of the Ruskin School of Art
Alumni of the Royal College of Art
Seoul National University alumni